Space dust may refer to:

 Cosmic dust, particles floating in space
 Regolith, loose particulate soil of which dust is a main component, typically in reference to extraterrestrial bodies
 Lunar soil/moon dust
 Space Dust, a 1970s confectionery brand
 Spacedust, a British music production duo
 Space Dust, a New Zealand space rock band formed in 1993
 "Space Dust", a song by Hawkwind
 Slang for crack cocaine dipped in PCP

See also 
 Stardust (disambiguation)

Cosmic dust